The University of Aden is the first Yemeni university beside Sana'a university at the same year founded in the Republic of Yemen.

History
The foundation of the College of Education in 1970 and Nasser’s College for Agricultural Sciences in 1972 was the launching point of the University of Aden. The two colleges were under the jurisdiction and authority of the Minister of Education. In 1974 the College of Economics was founded. Every college constitutes an administrative unit.
 
When necessity arose for the foundation more colleges, a ministerial decree was issued providing for the formation of a ministerial committee for the University Town presided by the prime minister.

On 10 September 1975, statute No. 22 for 1975 was issued pertaining to the foundation of the University of Aden as a scientific establishment. The statute determines the goals of the University of Aden as follows:
 Preparing and qualifying scientific cadres in specializations. 
 Performance of scientific researches that serve social and economic development. 
 Presentation of technical consultations for various state foundations.

In the year of its foundation, the university had already embraced the following colleges: 
 College of Education
 Nasser's College for Agricultural Sciences
 College of Economics 
 College of Medicine

From 1975 to 1999 a number of colleges and affiliate colleges were founded:
 College of Law  in 1978. 
 College of Engineering in 1978. 
 College of Education, Zingibar in 1979(Abyan Governorate). 
 College of Education, Saber in 1980 (Lahj Governorate).
 College of Education, Mukalla, 1974 (nucleus for Hadhramout University). 
 College of Education, Shabwa, 1994.
 College of Education, Yafa', 1998.
 College of Education, Radfan, 1998.
 College of Education, Dhala', 1998.
 College of Education, Lodar, 1998
 College of Oil and Mineralogy, Shabwa, 1996.

Partial closure
On 29 December 2015, Islamist gunmen forced the faculties of administrative sciences, law, and engineering to close, citing unacceptable levels of gender integration.

References

External links
 Official website

 
1975 establishments in Yemen
Educational institutions established in 1975

Aden